The boxelder bug (Boisea trivittata) is a North American species of true bug. It is found primarily on boxelder trees, as well as maple and ash trees. In 2020, this species invaded Chile, thus becoming an invasive species.

Etymology

Biology and taxonomy

Boxelder bugs feed almost entirely on the developing seeds of boxelder, maple, and ash trees. The boxelder bug is sometimes confused with insects belonging to the genus Jadera, and with the western boxelder bug (Boisea rubrolineata) which it is related to. The name "stink bug", which is more regularly applied to the family Pentatomidae, is sometimes incorrectly used to refer to Boisea trivittata. Instead, boxelder bugs belong to the family Rhopalidae, the so-called "scentless plant bugs". However, boxelder bugs are strong-smelling and to discourage predators will release a pungent and bad-tasting compound upon being disturbed. This allows them to form conspicuous aggregations without being preyed on. These insects feed, lay eggs and develop on boxelder trees, most commonly occurring on female trees as they produce seeds. Boxelder bugs prefer seeds; however, they also suck leaves. They can be frequently observed on maple as these trees provide them with seeds as well. Boxelder bugs overwinter in plant debris or protected human-inhabited places and other suitable structures.

As pests

Although they specialize on the seeds from maple, boxelder and ash, they may pierce other parts of the plant while feeding. They are not classified as an agricultural pest and are generally not considered injurious to ornamental plantings.  However, they are known to damage some fruits in the fall when they leave their summer quarters in trees and seek areas to overwinter. Feeding by the bugs produces dimples, scars, fruit deformation, corky tissue, and even premature fruit-drop in strawberries and some tree fruits.

During certain times of the year boxelder bugs cluster together in large groups while sunning themselves on warm surfaces near their host tree (e.g. on rocks, shrubs, trees, and man-made structures). This is especially a problem in the fall when they are seeking a warm place to overwinter. Large numbers are often seen congregating on houses seeking an entry point. Once they have gained access, they remain inactive behind siding and inside of walls while the weather is cool. Once the home's heating system becomes active for the season, the insects may falsely perceive it to be springtime and enter inhabited parts of the home in search of food and water. Once inside inhabited areas of a home, their excreta may stain upholstery, carpets, drapes, and they may feed on certain types of house plants. In the spring, the bugs leave their winter hibernation locations to feed and lay eggs on maple or ash trees. Clustered masses of boxelder bugs may be seen again at this time, and depending on the temperature, throughout the summer. Their outdoor congregation habits and indoor excreta deposits are perceived as a nuisance by many people, therefore boxelder bugs are often considered pests. However, boxelder bugs are harmless to people and pets. The removal of boxelder trees and maple trees can help control boxelder bug populations. Spiders are minor predators, but because of the boxelder bug's chemical defenses few birds or other animals will eat them. Boxelder bug populations are not affected by any major diseases or parasites.

References

External links
 
 Box Elder Bug – large format photos and information

Serinethinae
Household pest insects
Hemiptera of North America
Insects described in 1825
Taxa named by Thomas Say